Matthias Alexander Rath (born 2 August 1984) is a German dressage rider. Representing Germany, he competed at the 2010 World Equestrian Games and at three European Dressage Championships (in 2009, 2011 and 2015).

Altogether, Rath has won four team medals at various championships (one silver and three bronze). Meanwhile, his best individual championship result is 4th place in freestyle dressage at the 2011 European Dressage Championship, where he rode the famous stallion Totilas.

He also competed at the 2010 edition of Dressage World Cup finals in Den Bosch where he finished 8th.

References

Living people
1984 births
German male equestrians
German dressage riders